Fatty and the Broadway Stars is a 1915 American short comedy film directed by and starring Fatty Arbuckle.

Cast
 Roscoe 'Fatty' Arbuckle
 Ivy Crosthwaite
 Mack Sennett
 Joe Weber
 Lew Fields
 Sam Bernard
 William Collier Sr.
 Joe Jackson
 Brett Clark
 Harry Booker
 Mae Busch - Actress
 Glen Cavender - Actor
 Chester Conklin
 Alice Davenport
 Minta Durfee - Actress
 Lewis Hippe - (as Lew Hippe)
 Tom Kennedy
 Fred Mace - Actor
 Hank Mann
 Polly Moran
 Charles Murray
 Al St. John
 Slim Summerville
 Mack Swain
 Wayland Trask
 Bobby Vernon - Actor
 Harry Gribbon
 Edgar Kennedy
 Keystone Kops - Police Force
 Ford Sterling

See also
 List of American films of 1915
 Fatty Arbuckle filmography

External links

1915 films
Films directed by Roscoe Arbuckle
Films produced by Mack Sennett
Keystone Studios films
Triangle Film Corporation films
1915 comedy films
1915 short films
American silent short films
American black-and-white films
Silent American comedy films
American comedy short films
1910s American films
1910s English-language films